Hämeen-Anttila is a Finnish-language surname. Notable people with the surname include:
 Jaakko Hämeen-Anttila (born 1963), Finnish academic researcher
 Virpi Hämeen-Anttila (born 1958), Finnish writer

See also
Anttila (surname)

Compound surnames
Finnish-language surnames